Guido Andreozzi and Marcel Felder won the title defeating Thiago Alves and Augusto Laranja in the final 6–3, 6–3.

Seeds

Draw

Draw

References
 Main Draw

Rio Quente Resorts Tennis Classic - Doubles
2012 Doubles
Rio